The Constitution of India designates the official languages of India as Hindi and English. The number of bilingual speakers in India is 314.9 million, which is 26% of the population in 2011.

Multilingualism

Hindi
Hindi is one of the official languages of India and had 528 million native speakers as of the 2011 Census. About 139 million Indians speak Hindi as a second language and 24 million speak it as their third language.

Multilingualism by state
Combined percentages of first, second and third language speakers of Hindi and English in India from the 2011 Census.

See also
 Languages of India
 Languages with official status in India
 List of languages by number of native speakers in India

References